The Portage la Prairie station is on the Canadian National Railway mainline in Portage la Prairie, Manitoba Canada.  The station is served by Via Rail's transcontinental Canadian, and the Winnipeg–Churchill train. The station operates as a flag stop for the Canadian, with 48-hour advance notice. It is a regular stop on the Winnipeg-Churchill route. Formerly uses as Greyhound bus stop until early 2000s then moved to Portage la Prairie Mall.

The station was designated a national historic site in 1992.  The one story brick building was built by Grand Trunk Pacific Railway and the Midland Railway of Manitoba as a union station in 1908.

Also designated a national historic site is the Portage la Prairie Canadian Pacific Railway Station that no longer provides passenger services but operates as a museum.

Footnotes

External links 
Via Rail Station Information

Via Rail stations in Manitoba
Railway stations in Manitoba
Designated Heritage Railway Stations in Manitoba
Canadian Register of Historic Places in Manitoba
Railway stations in Canada opened in 1908
Union stations in Canada
Portage la Prairie
1908 establishments in Manitoba